The Frightened Lady is a 1932 British thriller film directed by T. Hayes Hunter and starring Emlyn Williams, Cathleen Nesbitt, Norman McKinnel and Belle Chrystall. It was adapted by Bryan Edgar Wallace from his father Edgar Wallace's 1931 play The Case of the Frightened Lady, which was adapted again later for a 1940 film.

The film is also known as Criminal at Large in the United States.

Plot
A young woman goes to stay at the house of Lord Lebanon, but two murders in quick succession lead to the arrival of detectives and cause the woman to fear for her life.

Cast
 Emlyn Williams as Lord Lebanon
 Cathleen Nesbitt as Lady Lebanon
 Norman McKinnel as Chief Inspector Tanner
 Gordon Harker as Sergeant Totty
 Belle Chrystall as Aisla Crane
 Cyril Raymond as Sergeant Ferraby
 Finlay Currie as Brooks
 Percy Parsons as Gilder
 Julian Royce as Kelver

Reception
Emlyn William's performance was voted best in a British film for 1932.

The New York Times found it "considerably more diverting on the stage than it is on the screen...It is a rugged shocker, and when it was not stripped of some of its good scenes it kept the spectator guessing...It is, however, a talented performance that Mr. Williams gives. Cathleen Nesbit does very well as the somewhat sinister dowager Lady Lebanon and Norman McKinnel, although handicapped by the direction, lends a certain distinction to the rôle of Tanner."

References

External links 
 

1932 films
1930s thriller films
Films based on works by Edgar Wallace
Films directed by T. Hayes Hunter
British black-and-white films
British thriller films
1930s English-language films
1930s British films